Paul Stanton may refer to:
 Paul Stanton (ice hockey) (born 1967), American ice hockey player
 Paul Stanton (actor) (1884–1955), American character actor
 Paul Stanton (politician) (born 1985), American politician
 David Beaty (author) (1911–1999), British writer, pilot, and psychologist, who wrote novels under the name Paul Stanton